In Greek mythology, as recorded in Homer's Iliad, Lycaon (Ancient Greek: Λυκάων; gen.: Λυκάονος) was a son of Priam and Laothoe, daughter of the Lelegian king Altes.

Mythology 
Lycaon was the half-brother of Hector.

Lycaon lent his cuirass to his brother Paris when he duelled against Menelaus, husband of Helen. On another occasion Apollo took the shape of Lycaon to address Aeneas. 

During the Trojan War, Lycaon was captured by Achilles while cutting branches in Priam's orchard. Achilles sold him as a slave to Euneus of Lemnos, but Eetion of Imbros bought him, took him back to Troy, and restored him to his father. 

Only twelve days later, he faced Achilles in battle, during Achilles' terrible wrath after the death of Patroclus. Lycaon grasped Achilles' knees and begged for mercy, either in exchange for a ransom or in memory of Patroclus' gentle nature; however, neither argument swayed Achilles, who slew him without pity.

Namesake 
 4792 Lykaon, Jovian asteroid named after Lycaon

See also
 List of children of Priam

Notes

References 

 Homer, The Iliad with an English Translation by A.T. Murray, Ph.D. in two volumes. Cambridge, MA., Harvard University Press; London, William Heinemann, Ltd. 1924. Online version at the Perseus Digital Library.
 Homer, Homeri Opera in five volumes. Oxford, Oxford University Press. 1920. Greek text available at the Perseus Digital Library.
 Pseudo-Apollodorus, The Library with an English Translation by Sir James George Frazer, F.B.A., F.R.S. in 2 Volumes, Cambridge, MA, Harvard University Press; London, William Heinemann Ltd. 1921. Online version at the Perseus Digital Library. Greek text available from the same website.

Trojans
Children of Priam
Princes in Greek mythology